Saharanpur Lok Sabha constituency is one of the 80 Lok Sabha (Lower house of the Parliament) constituencies in the state of Uttar Pradesh, India.

Assembly segments
Saharanpur Lok Sabha constituency comprises the following Legislative Assembly segments.

Members of Parliament

Election results

General election 2019

General election 2014

General election 1998

See also
 Saharanpur district
 List of Constituencies of the Lok Sabha

Notes
  Number (#) in the Assembly Segments table is the "Assembly Segment" number, not a serial number.
  During 1st & 2nd Lok Sabhas, Saharanpur Lok Sabha constituency was not in existence and was a combination of different constituencies.

References

External links
http://eciresults.ap.nic.in/ConstituencywiseS241.htm?ac=1

Lok Sabha constituencies in Uttar Pradesh
Politics of Saharanpur district